Admiral Parry may refer to:

Chris Parry (Royal Navy officer) (born 1953), British Royal Navy rear admiral
Edward Parry (Royal Navy officer) (1893–1972), British Royal Navy admiral
William Parry (Royal Navy officer, born 1705) (1705–1779), British Royal Navy admiral
William Edward Parry (1790–1855), British Royal Navy rear admiral

See also
Admiral Perry (disambiguation)